Touch is the area outside two touch-lines which define the sides of the playing area in a game of rugby football. As the touch-lines are not part of the playing area they are usually included as part of touch.

When a ball is "kicked into touch", it means that it has been kicked out of the playing area into the touch area. In American sports usage, the phrase "out of bounds" signifies the same as "touch."

See also

Touch judges, the officials who monitor the touch-lines
Out of bounds

References

External links

 Laws of Rugby Union

Rugby league terminology
Rugby union terminology